The Central District of Gonbad-e Qabus County is a district (bakhsh) in Gonbad-e Qabus County, Golestan Province, Iran. At the 2006 census, its population was 261,492, in 59,054 families.  The District has one city: Gonbad-e Qabus.  The District has four rural districts (dehestans): Aqabad Rural District, Bagheli-ye Marama Rural District, Fajr Rural District, and Soltanali Rural District.

References 

Districts of Golestan Province
Gonbad-e Kavus County